Gentlemen Prefer Blondes is a musical with a book by Joseph Fields and Anita Loos, lyrics by Leo Robin, and music by Jule Styne, based on the best-selling 1925 novel of the same name by Loos. The story involves an American woman's voyage to Paris to perform in a nightclub.

The musical opened on Broadway in 1949 (running for 740 performances and introducing Carol Channing), a London production was mounted in 1962, and there was a Broadway revival in 1995. It was made into a 1953 film of the same name, starring Jane Russell and Marilyn Monroe. The popular songs "Bye Bye Baby" and "Diamonds Are a Girl's Best Friend" were introduced in this musical. An adaptation called Lorelei (also starring Carol Channing) was performed on Broadway in 1974.

Synopsis 
Act I
In the 1920s, Lorelei Lee, a blonde from Little Rock, Arkansas, and her friend Dorothy Shaw board the ocean liner Ile de France, to embark for France ("It's High Time"). Lorelei and her boyfriend, Gus Esmond, are parting for a while ("Bye, Bye Baby"); Gus is going to Little Rock, and Dorothy is Lorelei's chaperone. On the ship, Lorelei has many admirers, including the rich Philadelphian Henry Spofford III, and an Englishman, Sir Francis (Piggy) Beekman. Lorelei is worried that Gus will find out about an old secret of hers and break off their engagement ("I'm Just A Little Girl From Little Rock"), and she is afraid to open a wire that she receives from him. Meanwhile, Dorothy flirts with a group of olympic sportsmen ("I Love What I'm Doing (When I'm Doing It For Love)"). Lorelei disapproves of this as the Olympians are poor; she is sure that Gus has broken up with her and tells Dorothy that they need to find some rich men. Lorelei chooses the zipper king, Josephus Gage. For Dorothy she chooses Henry Spofford. Lady Beekman is trying to sell her tiara to an American. Lorelei wishes to buy it, but does not have the money, so she decides to persuade Sir Francis to lend her the money ("It's Delightful Down In Chile").

On arrival in Paris, Dorothy and Henry are becoming attracted to each other ("Sunshine"). Two French detectives, Robert and Louie Lemanteur, are looking for Lorelei, trying to recover Lady Beekman's tiara. They don't speak much English, but they fall for the charms of the girls and offer to take them out. Josephus Gage arrives with Lorelei, wearing the first French dress to use a zipper. It is suggested that everyone have cocktails, to Mrs Spofford's delight, but Josephus does not drink, instead eating raw carrots ("I'm a Tingle I'm Aglow"). Henry, left alone with Dorothy, proposes marriage ("You Say You Care"), but she says that she is not good enough for him.

Gus arrives suddenly and discovers that Lorelei is dating Josephus. His father has always disapproved of Lorelei. Gus retaliates by dating Gloria Stark, a dancer, promising to make her a star.

Act II
Everyone is at a Paris club. Lady Beekman and the two detectives are still trying to recover her tiara. Sir Francis is there with two ladies. Lorelei and Dorothy are there with Josephus and Henry. Gus arrives and nearly comes to blows with Josephus. The floor show includes performances by Gloria ("Mamie Is Mimi") and Coquette. Lorelei sings too ("Diamonds are a Girl's Best Friend"). Gus tells Lorelei that he loves her so much that he would leave his father's business for her sake. She admits that she shot a man in Little Rock, but it was in self-defense (the man was attempting to rape her), so she was acquitted; they make up.

The Americans miss the United States ("Homesick Blues") and go home. Lorelei delays marrying Gus until his father accepts her. Mrs. Spofford gives Dorothy some advice ("Keeping Cool with Coolidge"). Gus's father, Mr. Esmond, arrives and finds that Lorelei is wearing a dress covered in his buttons and that she knows everything about his business ("Button Up with Esmond"). He is impressed and approves of the marriage.

Songs 

Act I
 "Overture" – Orchestra
 "It's High Time" – Dorothy Shaw and Ensemble
 "Bye, Bye Baby" – Gus Esmond and Lorelei Lee
 "I'm Just A Little Girl From Little Rock" – Lorelei Lee
 Encore: "I'm Just A Little Girl From Little Rock" – Lorelei Lee
 Dance Encore: "I'm Just A Little Girl From Little Rock" – Orchestra
 "I Love What I'm Doing" – Dorothy Shaw
 Dance: "I Love What I'm Doing" – Orchestra
 "Just a Kiss Apart" – Henry Spofford
 "Scherzo" (Gloria's Dance) – Orchestra
 "It's Delightful Down in Chile" – Sir Francis Beekman, Lorelei Lee, Show Girls and Male Ensemble
 "Sunshine" – Henry Spofford and Dorothy Shaw
 "Park Scene" – Chorus and Dancers
 "Pas De Deux" – Orchestra
 "Sunshine (Reprise)" – Ensemble
 "I'm A'Tingle, I'm A'Glow" – Josephus Gage
 "You Say You Care" – Dorothy Shaw and Henry Spofford
 "Finale Act I" ("I'm Just A Little Girl From Little Rock") – Lorelei Lee and Ensemble

Act II
 "Entr'acte" – Orchestra
 "Mamie is Mimi" – Gloria Stark, Coles and Atkins
 "Coquette" – The Tenor and Show Girls
 "Diamonds Are a Girl's Best Friend" – Lorelei Lee
 First Encore: "Diamonds Are a Girl's Best Friend" – Lorelei Lee
 Second Encore: "Diamonds Are a Girl's Best Friend" – Lorelei Lee
 "Gentlemen Prefer Blondes" – Lorelei Lee and Gus Esmond
 "Homesick Blues" – Lorelei Lee, Dorothy Shaw, Gus Esmond, Henry Spofford, Mrs. Ella Spofford and Josephus Gage
 "Keeping Cool with Coolidge" – Dorothy Shaw, Bill and Ensemble
 "Button Up With Esmond" – Lorelei Lee, Show Girls and Ensemble
 "Finale Act II" ("Gentlemen Prefer Blondes" and "Bye, Bye Baby") – Lorelei Lee, Gus Esmond and Ensemble

Cast

Productions

Original Broadway 
The musical opened on Broadway at the Ziegfeld Theatre on December 8, 1949, and closed September 15, 1951, after 740 performances. It was produced by Herman Levin and Oliver Smith, directed by John C. Wilson, and choreographed by Agnes de Mille, with vocal direction by Hugh Martin. Financial backers included Harold M. Esty Jr.

The original cast featured:
 Carol Channing as Lorelei Lee
 Yvonne Adair as Dorothy Shaw
 Rex Evans as Sir Francis Beekman
 Anita Alvarez as Gloria Stark
 Eric Brotherson as Henry Spofford
 Jack McCauley as Gus Esmond
 George S. Irving as Josephus Gage
 Irving Mitchell as Mr. Esmond Sr.
 Alice Pearce as Mrs. Ella Spofford
 Reta Shaw as Lady Phyllis Beekman
 June Kirby as Sun Bather

Several blonde actresses, including Betty Hutton, Jayne Mansfield (Carousel Theater, 1964), Mamie Van Doren, Carroll Baker (Dallas, August 1966), Barbara Eden (Florida, January 1999) and Morgan Fairchild have starred in regional and summer stock productions of Gentlemen Prefer Blondes over the years. Carroll Baker also performed two numbers from the show on The Ed Sullivan Show on 16 October 1966.

West End 
The musical ran in the West End at the Princes Theatre, opening on August 20, 1962, for 223 performances, and featured Dora Bryan as Lorelei Lee, Anne Hart as Dorothy, and Bessie Love as Mrs. Ella Spofford.

Broadway 1974 
A revised version titled Lorelei opened on Broadway at the Palace Theatre on January 27, 1974, and ran for 320 performances. This production also starred Carol Channing, who received a Tony Award nomination for Best Actress in a Musical.

Broadway 1995 
The Goodspeed Opera House, East Haddam, Connecticut, revival ran in November 1994, and featured KT Sullivan as Lorelei Lee, Karen Prunzik as Dorothy Shaw, Jamie Ross as Josephus Gage, and Allen Fitzpatrick as Gus Esmond. The production transferred to Broadway at the Lyceum Theatre on April 10, 1995 and closed on April 30, 1995, after 16 previews and 8 performances.

Other productions 
A concert staging of the musical was mounted as part of the "Discovering Lost Musicals" series directed and produced by Ian Marshall-Fisher at Barbican Cinema 1 in London in 1997, which featured Louise Gold as Lorelei Lee, Kim Criswell as Dorothy Shaw, and Dilys Laye as Mrs Ella Spofford.

The Open Air Theatre, Inner Circle, Regent's Park, London, production ran from July 23, 1998, through September 1, 1998, and featured Sara Crowe as Lorelei Lee and Debby Bishop as Dorothy.

42nd Street Moon theatre company, San Francisco, California, presented the musical in April 2004.

A staged concert production was presented in the Encores! series of Great American Musicals in Concert at the New York City Center May 9–13, 2012 with Megan Hilty as Lorelei Lee and Rachel York as Dorothy, directed by John Rando and choreographed by Randy Skinner.

In October 2019, the Union Theatre in London staged a production of the musical, directed and produced by Sasha Regan.

Film version 
A 1953 film adaptation, released by 20th century Fox, was directed by Howard Hawks and starred Jane Russell and Marilyn Monroe.

See also 
 Legacy Robe, which traces its beginnings to the original Broadway production of Gentleman Prefer Blondes

References

External links

 Gentlemen Prefer Blondes at the Internet Broadway Database, 1949 and 1995
 The New York Times review, December 9, 1949

1949 musicals
Plays set in the 1920s
Broadway musicals
Musicals based on novels
Musicals by Jule Styne
Musicals set in the Roaring Twenties
Plays set in France